Book of the Month (founded 1926) is a United States subscription-based e-commerce service that offers a selection of five to seven new hardcover books each month to its members. Books are selected and endorsed by a panel of judges, and members choose which book they would like to receive, similar to how the club originally operated when it began in 1926. Members can also discuss the books with fellow members in an online forum.

In late 2015, in concert with the club's 90th year, the club announced a relaunch into its current iteration. Within two years, the club had grown its membership to more than 100,000 members, primarily millennial women, and the club's presence on social media grew to over 1.2 million Instagram followers. Approximately 75% of the club's titles are by up-and-coming authors, and 80% of titles are fiction. The club has also worked with a series of celebrity guest judges who bring broader awareness to new titles, and continues producing its own versions of books that feature special endpapers and casings. In 2016, the club launched a Book of the Year award. In 2017, the club debuted its first ever television advertisement called "Monthly".

The club has a tradition of focusing on debut and emerging writers, and is known for having helped launch the careers of some of the most acclaimed authors in American literary history. In 1926 (its first year in operation), the Club featured Ernest Hemingway's The Sun Also Rises. In 1936 (its tenth year), the Club selected Gone with the Wind by unknown author Margaret Mitchell.  Mitchell wrote: "I wanted to thank [Book of the Month] from the bottom of my heart for selecting my book. It was quite the most exciting and unexpected thing that ever happened to me." In 1951 (its 25th year), the club distributed its 100 millionth book and selected J. D. Salinger's The Catcher in the Rye, which became both the most-censored and the most-taught book in America. In 1978, the Club selected By the Rivers of Babylon, the first book by Nelson DeMille, who later wrote: "I will be forever grateful to Book of the Month for ensuring that my first book, By the Rivers of Babylon, was not my last. When the Club selected Babylon in 1978, it reached hundreds of thousands of additional readers and became an instant best-seller."

History
Harry Scherman was a copywriter for the J. Walter Thompson advertising agency in 1916 when he set out to create the "Little Leather Library".  With his partners Max Sackheim, and Charles and Albert Boni, Scherman began a mail order service that offered "30 Great Books For $2.98" (miniature reprints "bound in limp Redcroft") and sold 40 million copies in its first five years. Sackheim and Scherman then founded their own ad agency devoted entirely to marketing books.

The problems of building interest in a new book led Scherman to create, along with Sackheim and Robert Haas (son of Kalman Haas), the Book-of-the-Month Club in 1926. As Scherman explained it, the club itself would be a "standard brand". "It establishes itself as a sound selector of good books and sells by means of its own prestige. Thus, the prestige of each new title need not be built up before becoming acceptable," he explained later. After starting with 4,000 subscribers, the club had more than 550,000 within twenty years. The size of the club did in fact create the Book of the Month Club as a brand. Being a "Book of the Month Club" selection was used to promote books to the general public.

Book of the Month Club was acquired by Time Inc. in 1977; Time Inc. merged with Warner Communications in 1989. The original judges panel was eliminated in 1994. In 2000, the Book-of-the-Month Club, Inc. merged with Doubleday Direct, Inc. The resulting company, Bookspan, was a joint venture between Time Warner and Bertelsmann until 2007 when Bertelsmann took over complete ownership. In 2008, Bertelsmann sold its US subscription business to the private equity firm Najafi Companies. In 2013, Najafi sold Bookspan to current parent company Pride Tree Holdings, Inc.

Membership terms 
The club operates a subscription program, similar to other box subscription services, where customers select a membership plan for a set period of time (3-months, 6-months or 12-months) and books are shipped to all members during the first seven days of the month.

Historically, when the club operated through mail-order catalogs, membership involved a "negative response" system whereby a member was shipped the monthly selection on a particular date if the selection was not declined before that date. Members had the option to respond by declining the selection or opting to order another book or merchandise instead. No response was deemed acceptance of the selection.

Book of the Year Award 
In late 2016, the club announced its first annual Book of the Year Award, the finalists for which are chosen by the club's members.  The award is called the "Lolly", in tribute to Lolly Willowes, the first book selected by the club back in 1926. "Lolly Willowes" was written by Sylvia Townsend Warner, who later went on to become a prolific writer and even wrote short stories for The New Yorker.  In 2017, the award added a $10,000 prize, and the winner was The Heart's Invisible Furies by Irish author John Boyne. In 2018, the members voted Circe by Madeline Miller as best book of the year. In 2019, the members voted Daisy Jones & The Six by Taylor Jenkins Reid as best book of the year. In 2020, the members voted The Vanishing Half by Brit Bennett as best book of the year.

Winners by Year 
2016: Bryn Greenwood - All the Ugly and Wonderful Things
Paul Kalanithi - When Breath Becomes Air
Ruth Ware - The Woman in Cabin 10
Blake Crouch - Dark Matter 
Amor Towles - A Gentleman in Moscow

2017: John Boyne - The Heart's Invisible Furies
Taylor Jenkins Reid - The Seven Husbands of Evelyn Hugo
Jesmyn Ward - Sing, Unburied, Sing
Celeste Ng - Little Fires Everywhere
Ruth Emmie Lang - Beasts of Extraordinary Circumstances

2018: Madeline Miller - Circe
Tayari Jones - An American Marriage
Helen Hoang - The Kiss Quotient
Kristin Hannah - The Great Alone
A.J. Finn - The Woman in the Window

2019: Taylor Jenkins Reid - Daisy Jones & The Six
Blake Crouch - Recursion
Etaf Rum - A Woman is No Man
William Kent Krueger - This Tender Land
Alex Michaelides - The Silent Patient

2020: Brit Bennett - The Vanishing Half
Abi Daré - The Girl with the Louding Voice
Lucy Foley - The Guest List
Fredrik Backman - Anxious People
V.E. Schwab - The Invisible Life of Addie LaRue

2021: Kristin Hannah - The Four Winds
Taylor Jenkins Reid - Malibu Rising
Emily Henry - People We Meet on Vacation
S.A. Cosby - Razorblade Tears
Sarah Penner - The Lost Apothecary

2022: Gabrielle Zevin - Tomorrow, and Tomorrow, and Tomorrow
Stacy Willingham - A Flicker In the Dark
Charmaine Wilkerson - Black Cake
Amor Towles - The Lincoln Highway
Ali Hazelwood - The Love Hypothesis

References

Further reading 
 The Hidden Public: The Story of the Book-of-the-Month Club by Charles Lee (New York: Doubleday & Company, 1958) provides a history of the club, the book selection and membership procedures, and a list of all selections, dividends, and alternates from 1926 to 1957.
 The Books of the Century, a website compiled by Daniel Immerwahr (Northwestern University), lists the Club's main selections from 1926 until the mid-1970s.
 Janice Radway, A Feeling for Books: The Book-of-the-Month Club, Literary Taste, and Middle-Class Desire (Chapel Hill, 1997) offers a cultural analysis of the BOMC and its readers.
 William Zinsser, A Family of Readers; An informal portrait of the Book-of-the-Month Club and its members on the occasion of its 60th Anniversary. New York: Book-of-the-Month Club, 1986. 74 pp.

External links
 Book of the Month website
 Book-of-the-Month Club Records. Yale Collection of American Literature, Beinecke Rare Book and Manuscript Library.

Direct marketing
Bertelsmann
Publishing companies established in 1926
Book publishing companies of the United States
Entertainment companies of the United States
Book clubs
1923 establishments in the United States